Beliș is a commune in Cluj County, Transylvania, Romania. It is composed of seven villages: Bălcești (Balktelep), Beliș, Dealu Botii (Kerekhegy), Giurcuța de Jos (Alsógyurkuca), Giurcuța de Sus (Felsőgyurkuca), Poiana Horea (Dealul Calului until 1941 and in 1954-1956; Gyálukaluluj) and Smida.

Demographics 
According to the census from 2011 there was a total population of 1,164 people living in the commune. Of this population, 99.14% are ethnic Romanians, 0.34% are ethnic Hungarians.

Tourism 
 Horea's tree from Scorușet forest
 Beliș lake and Beliș-Fântânele tourist facility
 Wooden church (1764) of Dealu Negru

References

External links
Demography of Beliş

Communes in Cluj County
Localities in Transylvania